Air Philippines Flight 541 was a scheduled domestic flight operated by Air Philippines from Ninoy Aquino International Airport in Manila to Francisco Bangoy International Airport in Davao City. On April 19, 2000, the Boeing 737-2H4 crashed in Samal, Davao del Norte while on approach to the airport, killing all 124 passengers and 7 crew members. It remains the deadliest air disaster in the Philippines and the third deadliest accident involving the Boeing 737-200, after Mandala Airlines Flight 091, which crashed 5 years later, and Indian Airlines Flight 113.

Aircraft and Crew

Aircraft 

The aircraft, a Boeing 737-2H4, registration RP-C3010 and previously owned by Southwest Airlines as N50SW, was first delivered in February 1978 and was sold to Air Philippines 20 years later.

Passengers and Crew 

In command of the flight was Captain Estraton Catipay - the youngest pilot to have served for Philippine Airlines in the 1960s. Acting as the first officer for the trip was 22-year old Captain Don Sardalla. 

There were 124 passengers (19 of them children) and 7 crew members, totalling 131 people on board. The flight was packed as it was the start of celebrating the Easter season and transportation services across the Philippines are particularly heavily crowded, with people taking advantage of the long holidays going back to their hometowns from different places in the country. Among the victims were the sister-in-law, nephew, and niece of then-Governor of Cotabato Emmanuel Piñol.

Accident 
On April 19, 2000, Flight 541, with 131 passengers and crew, left Manila at about 5:30 AM, bound for Davao City. At around 7 AM, the aircraft was approaching runway 05 following an Airbus A320 operated by Philippine Airlines. When Flight 541 broke free from the clouds the crew observed that the aircraft had not yet cleared the runway, at which time they advised ATC, or air traffic control, a missed approach procedure should be performed. Flight 541 began to climb and re-entered the clouds. Instead, the pilots attempted to fly VFR in instrument conditions at a lower altitude. The plane subsequently caught fire and disintegrated; there were no survivors.

Aftermath 
Villagers on the island said the plane was flying at low altitude and hit the top of a coconut tree, which knocked off part of its wing. They said it appeared the plane tried to pull up under full engine power, but failed and crashed. The plane caught fire when it came down in a coconut grove. Airport officials said skies were foggy at the time of the accident.

Francisco Bangoy International Airport did not have full equipment for instrument landings at that time, and visual landings had been suspended several minutes before the crash.

References

External links

Pre-crash photos of RP-C3010
Crash site of Flight 541 from Associated Press Archive

2000 disasters in the Philippines
Aviation accidents and incidents in 2000
Aviation accidents and incidents in the Philippines
Aviation accidents and incidents involving controlled flight into terrain
Accidents and incidents involving the Boeing 737 Original
History of Davao del Norte
April 2000 events in the Philippines